Litoral del San Juan is a municipality and town in the Chocó Department, Colombia.

Climate
Litoral del San Juan has an extremely wet tropical rainforest climate (Af) with very heavy to extremely heavy rainfall year-round. The following climate data is for Santa Genoveva de Docordó, the capital of the municipality.

References

Municipalities of Chocó Department